Perl D. Decker (September 10, 1875 – August 22, 1934) was a U.S. Representative from Missouri.

Born on a farm near Coolville, Ohio, Decker moved with his parents to a farm near Hollis, Kansas, in 1879.
He attended the public schools of Cloud County, and Park College, Parkville, Missouri, from which he was graduated in 1897.
He graduated in law from the University of Kansas at Lawrence in 1899.
He was admitted to the bar in 1900 and commenced practice at Joplin, Missouri.
He served as city attorney from 1900–1902.

Decker was elected as a Democrat to the Sixty-third, Sixty-fourth, and Sixty-fifth Congresses (March 4, 1913 – March 4, 1919). On April 5, 1917, he was one of 50 representatives who voted against declaring war on Germany.
He was an unsuccessful candidate for reelection in 1918 to the Sixty-sixth Congress.
He resumed the practice of law in Joplin, Missouri.
He served as delegate to the Democratic National Convention in 1932.
He died in Kansas City, Missouri, August 22, 1934.
He was interred in Mount Hope Cemetery, Joplin, Missouri.

References

External links
 

1875 births
1934 deaths
University of Kansas School of Law alumni
Democratic Party members of the United States House of Representatives from Missouri
Politicians from Joplin, Missouri
People from Athens County, Ohio